Punggol MRT/LRT station is a Mass Rapid Transit (MRT) and Light Rail Transit (LRT) interchange station in Punggol, Singapore. It is an interchange station between the North East line (NEL) and Punggol LRT (PGLRT), and the only MRT station located within Punggol planning area. Stretching across Punggol Central, the station is situated next to Punggol Temporary Bus Interchange and the retail development of Waterway Point.

The station was completed on 20 June 2003 alongside the other NEL stations. It is the northernmost terminus on the North East line until the expected completion of Punggol Coast station in 2024. By 2032, the station will become the terminus of the future Cross Island line (CRL) Punggol extension from Pasir Ris station, making it a triple-line interchange station.

History

North East line (NEL) and LRT

Plans and studies had been made since 1984 for a possible north-east line serving from Outram Park to Punggol via Dhoby Ghaut. The plans for the line were approved by the Mass Rapid Transit Corporation (MRTC) in October 1987 and submitted to the government. When the 16 NEL stations were revealed in March 1996, Punggol was confirmed to be the northern terminus of the line. However, it was not planned to be built until the area has been developed extensively.

During the 1996 National Day Rally Speech, the then prime minister Goh Chok Tong announced that the station will serve the upcoming Punggol 21 development.

In July 1998, it was further announced that the station would be linked to the upcoming LRT system serving the area. The contract for the design and construction of the  Punggol LRT system was awarded to a joint venture, comprising Singapore Technologies Industrial Corporation, Mitsubishi Heavy Industries and Mitsubishi Corporation, at a contract sum of S$656 million (US$ million).

Constructed in the middle of the forest (eventually cleared to make way for the construction), the station site was not easily accessible. The Land Transport Authority (LTA) staff raised certain safety concerns especially for women staff using the  track. To address this, the LTA provided bus service to transport people in and out of the site. The staff encountered a few cobras during the station's construction, mainly killed and overrun by tractors.

The NEL station opened on 20 June 2003. On 29 January 2005, the station began to serve the east loop of the PGLRT. On 29 June 2014, the station began to serve the west loop.

Future plans and Cross Island line (CRL)
During the construction of the NEL station, a  box was already constructed beneath the NEL station to allow provisions for a possible future line. The station box was reserved for the North Shore line, an LRT line that would link between Pasir Ris and Woodlands or Sembawang. First announced in December 1996, the line would have been built after the completion of developments in Simpang and Punggol.

On 10 March 2020, the LTA announced that Punggol station will be the terminus of the proposed Cross Island line (CRL) Punggol extension. The Punggol extension consists of four stations between this station and Pasir Ris station, going through Punggol Central and Lorong Halus. The extension was originally scheduled to be completed in 2031. However, with restrictions imposed on construction works due to the COVID-19 pandemic, the expected completion date was pushed to 2032.

The contract for the design and construction of Punggol CRL Station and associated tunnels was awarded to Woh Hup (Private) Limited at S$496 million (US$ million). Construction will start in 2023, with an expected completion in date of 2032.

Incidents
On 27 February 2020, a power fault along the NEL resulted in service disruptions to the Punggol, Sengkang and Buangkok stations. At 5:36am, a shuttle train service was provided which operated on a single platform between the Punggol and Buangkok stations. In order to facilitate the repair work, the power source to the tracks between the Hougang and Punggol stations was disconnected. Additionally, free regular and bridging bus services were provided to serve these stations. The repair works were completed by 11:49am and normal service along the entire NEL was resumed at 12:14pm. Further investigation revealed that a broken contact wire had affected the power source to trains moving off from Sengkang Depot, causing the service disruptions.

Station details

Services
The station serves both the Punggol LRT line (PGLRT) and the North East line (NEL). The station code is NE17/PTC as reflected on official maps. The station is the current terminus of the NEL, with the next station being Sengkang station. The station will be extended one stop to Punggol Coast station in 2024. The NEL platforms operate between 5:40am and 11:30pm daily.

On the PGLRT, the station is between the Cove and Damai stations on the East loop, and between the Sam Kee and Soo Teck stations on the West loop. The LRT platforms operate between 5:20am and 12:40am daily.

Design

The station has three levels and four entrances. Designed by two architectural firms – 3HPArchitects and Farrells – the station is intended to be integrated with the LRT station and the bus interchange. The station's curved aluminium and stainless steel cladding gives it a futuristic outlook, best reflecting the developments of Punggol 21.

Being above-ground, the station has higher air-conditioning demands. Hence, more room was needed for the air-conditioning plant rooms. A major road namely Punggol Central runs through the middle of the station, bisecting the concourse. Hence, the station has an underpass linking both sides of the road outside the paid area. Due to its extensive structure (occupying an area of about ) the station has the most lifts (6) on the line.

Public artwork

Punggol station features an artwork Water, Landscape & Future by Goh Beng Kwan as part of the network's Art-in-Transit programme. The artwork consists of a set of nine glass paintings displayed around the concourse, with each  glass panel reflecting natural light in the station. The glass paintings represent elements of water, the seaside, kampongs and trees, with pieces of materials embedded in the glass to create a shimmering effect.

In the work, the artist uses various colours (blue/turquoise for the sea, yellow/brown/sienna for the kampungs and green for the trees) which reflects his memories of Punggol's past. While his inspiration is from the past, the artist used a contemporary style for this work, intending for his work to remain "fresh and appealing" to the residents of Punggol then, now and the future. First creating his work using oil and acrylic on canvas, Goh has the computer-generated copies put up in a 3D-model of the station. Presenting his work, the artist recounted that he had a difficult time convincing the Art Review Panel that the work could last a long time in a public place.

This was the first time Goh used glass as a medium. Creating the work required patience, as Goh had to repeatedly fire the glass after applying colour on the panel. As glass is fragile, a panel broke apart after being fired seven times. Recounting this as a "heartbreak", the artist went on to seek help from Howard Chua of Sun Glass. Chua then experimented with materials and colours to create the textures and colours closer to the originals. He used a unique method of integrating glass with glass and other materials. Hoping to recreate the textures of cloth and paper in the originals, new materials were introduced, while firing techniques were refined. The artist was fascinated by the "element of spontaneity" during the firing process, as the colours produced after the process vary greatly with different methods.

Seeing the artwork for himself, Goh realised that he could continue conveying himself through glass to accomplish his artistic vision. The artist "took pride" in the fact that he only needed natural lighting for his works, instead of special lighting. He hoped that his work would signal to commuters that they have arrived at Punggol. Additionally, for the elderly, he hoped the work will make them "think of the sea" and their youth.

Notes and references

Footnotes

References

Bibliography

External links

 Official website

Railway stations in Singapore opened in 2003
Railway stations in Punggol
Punggol
LRT stations in Punggol
Mass Rapid Transit (Singapore) stations
Light Rail Transit (Singapore) stations
Terry Farrell buildings